The New Democratic Party  was a centre-right, conservative political party in Albania founded in 1999 as a split from the Democratic Party of Albania. It was led by Genc Pollo.

PDR was part of the Alliance for Freedom, Justice and Welfare coalition. In the parliamentary elections of 2005 PDR won four seats on the proportional list.

The party led by Genc pollo who was the deputy chairman of the Democratic Party. Created The NDP which he claimed to be the alternative choice for those right-wingers who had lost faith in the leadership of the Democratic Party and especially in its leader Sali Berisha. While the NDP had argued against Berisha and the DP. The NDP joined the Berisha I Government. The Party was an observer member of the European People's Party (EPP). October 2008 Genc Pollo and Sali Berisha, Prime Minister and head of the Democratic Party, the senior party in the government coalition, had announced their parties will merge before the 2009 election. The NDP reunited with the DP again in 2009.

MPS

Election results

References 

Defunct political parties in Albania
Political parties established in 1999
1999 establishments in Albania
Political parties disestablished in 2009
2009 disestablishments in Albania